Bertrand Freiesleben (born 4 October 1967 in Lübeck, West Germany) is a German artist.

Early life
Freiesleben's father is a microbiologist and his mother a hand-weaver. They both have always been encouraging his musical and artistic talents since early age. His encounter with Henry Moore and Emilio Vedova during the 80's influenced his career choice.

Education and career 
After Graduating from Johanneum zu Lübeck and the completion of his civil service, he studied sculpture at the Muthesius Academy of Fine Arts and Design in Kiel. However, he abandoned his studies to relocate to New York City where he worked as a conceptual artist till 1992. 
Back in Germany, he studied both History of Art and Philosophy at the Free University of Berlin till 1998. 

The same year he received the Grand Prix de l’Académie des Beaux-Arts (Prix de portrait Paul-Louis Weiller) of the Institut de France. After the completion of his studies, he was teaching compositional analysis and surface geometry at the Institute of Art History of Free University of Berlin till 2005. In 2000 he was invited as a guest professor at Université Paris 8.

Freiesleben works only from live models and for the past two decades is devoted to sculpted portraits.

He is married to the painter Eva Scheide and they have three children. They live and work in Berlin, Germany.

Works

 1995: Christian Modersohn
 2005: Walter Scheel
 2006: Rolf Hoppe, Kurt Biedenkopf, Viktor Korchnoi
 2007: Richard von Weizsäcker, Peter Sodann, Ralf Dahrendorf, Walter Kempowski, Egon Bahr
 2008: Roman Herzog, Klaus von Dohnanyi, Henning Voscherau, Hans-Jochen Vogel, Uwe Seeler
 2009: Hildegard Hamm-Brücher, Hans von Dohnanyi, Kurt Masur, Walter Scheel
 2010: Johannes Heesters, Hans Riegel, Erol Sander, Vladimir Kramnik, Wolfgang Menge

Awards 
 1998: Grand Prix de l’Académie des Beaux-Arts (Prix de portrait Paul-Louis Weiller), Institut de France, Paris, France
 2010: Auslandsstipendium der Kulturstiftung der Länder

Works in collections
 Friedrich Naumann Foundation
 ThyssenKrupp AG
 Humboldt University of Berlin
 DGFP German Association for Personnel Management
 FDP Free Democratic Party
 LSE London School of Economics
 City of Solingen
 Bechtler Museum of Modern Art, Charlotte NC
 HSV Museum, Hamburg

References
Künstler Bertrand Freiesleben at Der Tagesspiegel (in German)
Bertrand Freiesleben at Stilwerk (in German)

External links
Bertrand Freiesleben official website

1967 births
Living people
Artists from Lübeck
German sculptors
German male sculptors
Contemporary sculptors
Portrait artists
Free University of Berlin